Hackwood Park is a large country estate that primarily consists of an early 18th-century ornamental woodland and formal lawn garden and a large detached house. It is within the boundaries of Winslade, an overwhelmingly rural parish immediately south of Basingstoke in Hampshire. In its  grounds contain 23 separately listed structures including a teahouse pavilion, an ornamental bridge, statue of George I of Great Britain, three dispersed stone tōrōs, five urns and two fountains, a coach house and stables. Sheep and deer are tended to on grounds behind a variously arc-shaped and straight ha-ha wall.

The park and gardens are Grade I listed on the Register of Historic Parks and Gardens and the main house is Grade II* listed on the National Heritage List for England.

History
The estate was owned by the manor or rectory of Eastrop until 1223, when it became a noble's deer park in its own right. It was acquired by William Paulet, 1st Marquess of Winchester in the sixteenth century.

The bulk of the structure of the house currently standing was built from 1683 to 1687 for a son of the fifth Marquess, Charles Paulet, created Duke of Bolton. It currently has 24 bedrooms and 20 bathrooms. The estate was inherited by his son, Charles Paulet, 2nd Duke of Bolton in 1699, followed by his grandson, Charles Powlett, 3rd Duke of Bolton in 1772.

The estate was painted by Paul Sandby in 1764.

Lord Curzon was a tenant from 1906 until his death in 1925, and it was he who had restored the ancient open-air cockpit, “a hollow, grass-sown cup with sloping bank surrounded by a row of yews and with a flight of steps leading down to the floor of the arena.” [quote from “The Life of Lord Curzon,” volume 3, by Ronaldshay, 1928]

The estate was sold in 1936 to William Berry, 1st Viscount Camrose. During World War II it served as a psychiatric hospital for the Canadian Army. When Lord Camrose died in 1954 the property was inherited by his son, Seymour Berry, 2nd Viscount Camrose, who remained its owner until his death in 1995. His wife, Lady Camrose, the mother of Aga Khan IV, lived there until her death in 1997.

The property was put on the market in 2016 for offers in the region of £65 million since which the asking price is available on application.

Gardens
The grounds, outside of the focal lawn known as Spring Wood, were designed by Charles Bridgeman, with additional buildings designed by James Gibbs. Spring Wood is of academic interest as may be the sole surviving garden wood laid out in the French style. It has eight sectors divided by walkways, many of which the listed features such as the temple, a fountain and amphitheatre. In the spring, the woodland is colour-filled with bulbs and wild flowers.

See also
Berry baronets
Winslade

References

1687 establishments in England
Basingstoke and Deane
Country houses in Hampshire
Grade I listed parks and gardens in Hampshire
Grade II listed buildings in Hampshire
Grade II* listed buildings in Hampshire
Grade II* listed houses
Houses completed in 1687